Richard Maxwell Fox (1816 – 26 April 1856) was an Irish Independent Irish Party and Repeal Association politician.

Born in Raheny, Dublin, Fox was the son of Francis Fox and Frances, daughter of Jemmett Browne and Frances née Blennerhassett. In 1835, he married Susan Amelia Halsted, daughter of William Halsted and Emma Mary née Pellew, and they had six children: Emma Louisa; Frances Amelia; Annie Elizabeth (died 1878); Susan Henrietta (died 1883); Francis William (1836–1855); and Richard Edward (1846–1885).

He also had two children with actress Frances Medex - Walter Charles Fox Medex and Marianne Rose Fox.

Fox became a Repeal Association MP for Longford at the 1847 general election and, becoming an Independent Irish MP in 1852, held the seat until his death in 1856.

Fox died on 26 April 1856 at St Leonards-on-Sea.

References

External links
 

1816 births
People from Raheny
Irish Nationalist politicians
Irish Repeal Association MPs
UK MPs 1847–1852
UK MPs 1852–1857
Members of the Parliament of the United Kingdom for County Longford constituencies (1801–1922)
1856 deaths